The 61st edition of the KNVB Cup started on August 19, 1978. The first final was played on May 15, 1979: the match Ajax – FC Twente ended a draw: 1–1 (after extra time). Instead of a penalty shootout, a replay was held on May 29. In that match, Ajax beat FC Twente 3–0 and won the cup for the eighth time. During the quarter and semi-finals of the tournament, two-legged matches were held.

Teams
 All 18 participants of the Eredivisie 1978-79
 All 19 participants of the Eerste Divisie 1978-79
 9 teams from lower (amateur) leagues

First round
The matches of the first round were played on August 19 and 20, 1978.

1 Eerste Divisie; A Amateur teams

Second round
The matches of the second round were played on October 14, 15 and 25, 1978. The Eredivisie clubs entered the tournament this round.

E Eredivisie

Round of 16
The matches were played on November 18 and 19, 1978.

Quarter finals
The quarter finals were played on March 14 and April 4, 1979.

Semi-finals
The semi-finals were played on April 18 and May 2, 1979.

Final

Replay

Ajax also won the Dutch Eredivisie championship, thereby taking the double. They would participate in the European Cup, so finalists Twente could play in the Cup Winners' Cup.

See also
 Eredivisie 1978-79
 Eerste Divisie 1978-79

External links
 Netherlands Cup Full Results 1970–1994 by the RSSSF

1978-79
1978–79 domestic association football cups
KNVB Cup